The Mighty Crusaders is a 1957 film about the First Crusade (1096–1099), based on the 16th-century Italian poem Jerusalem Delivered by Torquato Tasso.

This film was directed by Carlo Ludovico Bragaglia. The Italian version was written by Sandro Continenza and the English translation was written by Annalena Limentani and Frederica Nutter.

Plot 
The film is based on the poem by Torquato Tasso, and is set in the time of the Crusades in Jerusalem. The commander Godfrey of Bouillon, Christian blessed by the pope, is attacking the Holy City for years, with no victory. In fact, his work is to free the Holy Sepulchre of Christ from the hands of the Muslim infidels. The best soldier of Godfrey's troop is Tancredi, who during a battle, confronts a Muslim soldier. While this soldier is very strong, Tancredi discovers that "he" is a young woman, named Clorinda. The two fall in love while the war rages; but unfortunately their love does not last long; the witch Armida, with his faithful Muslims, creates a spell that affects Tancredi and Clorinda, who resume to fight in the war against each other.

The original work 
The writer Torquato Tasso wrote the work in the period of the Counter-Reformation when the Pope had full power over everything and everyone. In particular, the Pontiff governed every monastic order, even condemning some that he considered heretics, and moreover, thanks to the publication of the Index of forbidden books, he forced contemporary writers to publish works that were not against the Church and especially that spoke of beauty and of magnificence of the Christian religion.

Tasso thus found himself forced to write an epic poem, very different from Ludovico Ariosto's Orlando furioso and Virgil's Aeneid, so that he would not incur the wrath of the Holy Inquisition that condemned both the writer and the work he created to the stake. Tasso therefore wanted in his work to exalt and celebrate the power of God and the Catholic religion, staging in the plot a new version of the clashes of the centuries before the sixteenth century between Christians and Muslims in the Holy Land. The finale included the victory of the Catholics, however Tasso makes numerous references to aspects of Catholicism and clerical institutions in the poem, such as the transplantation of a Christian banner inside Jerusalem, after it has been "liberated" from and with the infidel presence. the Holy Sepulcher of Jesus Christ; or even the presence of demons and devils that compromise the outcome of the battle. In particular, the enemy woman, that is Muslim, is again demonized and considered as a witch and in the work there is the example of the sorceress Armida who, foreseeing the future thanks to Satan, often manages to make the Muslim sovereign Argante win in combat.

Cast
Francisco Rabal as Tancredi d'Altavilla 
Sylva Koscina as Clorinda 
Gianna Maria Canale as Armida 
Rik Battaglia as Rinaldo d'Este 
Philippe Hersent as Godfrey of Bouillon 
Andrea Aureli as Argante
Alba Arnova as Harem Dancer
Nando Tamberlani as Pietro 
Cesare Fantoni as Aladino
Carlo Hintermann as Dilone

Release
The Might Crusaders was released in United States in January 1961.

See also
 list of historical drama films

References

Footnotes

Sources

External links
 

1957 films
1950s historical films
Italian historical films
Crusades films
Films based on poems
Films set in the 11th century
Films directed by Carlo Ludovico Bragaglia
Cultural depictions of Godfrey of Bouillon
Films about nobility
1950s Italian films
1960s Italian films